Prince  was the 13th head of the Mito branch of the Tokugawa clan and the President of the House of Peers in the Diet of Japan.

Biography
Kuniyuki Tokugawa inherited the title of shishaku (侯爵, marquis) under the kazoku peerage system on the death of his father, Tokugawa Atsuyoshi in 1898. A scholar, he turned his attention in 1906 to the completion of the Dai Nihonshi, a comprehensive history of Japan begun by his ancestor, Tokugawa Mitsukuni in the 17th century. However, in 1910, he was accepted into the 22nd class of the Imperial Japanese Army Academy, and was commissioned as Second lieutenant in the Imperial Japanese Army.  He resigned his commission in 1914 citing health reasons, and went into the reserves in 1915.

From December 1911, Kuniyuki Tokugawa served as a member of the House of Peers of the Diet of Japan. On the completion of the Dai Nihonshi in 1929, he was awarded the title of koshaku (公爵, prince).  On June 25, 1940, he accepted the post of honorary president of Japanese Red Cross Society.  From October 11, 1944, to June 19, 1946, he served as the President of the House of Peers.

On his death in 1969, he was succeeded as head of the Mito branch of the Tokugawa clan by Kuninari Tokugawa.

References
 Banno, Junji. The Establishment of the Japanese Constitutional System. Routledge (1992). 
Lebra, Sugiyama Takie. Above the Clouds: Status Culture of the Modern Japanese Nobility. University of California Press (1995). 
 Sims, Richard. Japanese Political History Since the Meiji Renovation 1868–2000. Palgrave Macmillan.

External links

1886 births
1969 deaths
Kazoku
Mito-Tokugawa family
Members of the House of Peers (Japan)